The 1969 Texas Longhorns football team represented the University of Texas at Austin in the 1969 NCAA University Division football season. The Longhorns won all eleven games to win their second consensus national championship; the first was six seasons earlier in 1963.

The 1969 team is the last all-white team to be named consensus national champions with the onset of  Julius Whittier, the first African-American player in Texas football history, was enrolled at UT as a freshman but was not eligible to play; NCAA rules of the time barred freshmen from playing varsity football and

Season
Ranked fourth to start the year, the #2 Longhorns defeated rival Oklahoma by ten points on October 11, and gained the top spot in the polls in late November. On December 6, #1 Texas traveled to Fayetteville to meet second-ranked Arkansas; down by fourteen points in the fourth quarter, UT rallied to win  in the season's "Game of the Century," attended by President  With a wishbone option offense, the Longhorns won all ten games in the regular season, and returned to the Cotton Bowl Classic in Fair Park in Dallas.

On New Year's Day 1970, the Longhorns met ninth-ranked Notre Dame, in its first bowl game in 45 years and second overall; their only previous postseason appearance was a win in the Rose Bowl in January 1925. Trailing for most of the game, Texas scored with 68 seconds remaining and won  On their final drive, the Longhorns faced fourth down twice. It was their twentieth consecutive victory, second straight Cotton Bowl Classic title, and third win that season in the stadium.

Schedule

Roster

Rankings

Game summaries

at California

vs. Texas Tech

vs. Navy

vs. Oklahoma

vs. Rice

at SMU

vs. Baylor

vs. TCU

at Texas A&M

at Arkansas

With two legendary coaches (Broyles and Royal), two neighboring states, two football powerhouses (8 of last 10 SWC Championships), and two recent National Championships (Arkansas in 1964 and Texas in 1963),  Arkansas and Texas had developed a rivalry. The game was moved from the usual third week in October to the first week in December so it could be televised nationally on ABC. President Richard Nixon attended the game, and AstroTurf was even installed in Razorback Stadium in preparation for the game.

Arkansas' top-rated defense was going up against the #1-rated Texas offense, but the Hogs got on top early, with a 1-yard TD run by Bill Burnett. After halftime, Chuck Dicus hauled in a 29-yard touchdown pass, giving the Razorbacks a 14–0 lead heading into the game's final quarter. Longhorn QB James Street then led his squad to its first touchdown, and as coach Darrell Royal had planned, Texas attempted and completed the two-point conversion, which would in all likelihood prevent a tie.

Arkansas then had the ball and the lead, and a 73-yard drive later, the Hogs were in good position to tack on a field goal that would put the game out of reach, but Razorback QB Bill Montgomery was intercepted in the end zone, giving the Longhorns new life. The Texas drive appeared stalled at the Longhorns' own 43, on a 4th and 3, when Royal gambled again. A 44-yard pass to Randy Peschel, who caught the ball in double coverage, put Texas at the Arkansas 13. Longhorn RB Jim Bertelsen would run in for the tying six points. The extra-point snap was high, but was snared by third-string QB Donnie Wigginton and the kick was converted by Longhorn kicker Happy Feller, giving Texas a 15–14 lead with 3:58 to play.

Arkansas drove to the Texas 40, looking for a field goal from All-American kicker Bill McClard, but the turnover bug struck again as Montgomery was again picked off.

vs. Notre Dame (Cotton Bowl)

NFL Draft
Three seniors from the 1969 Longhorns were selected in the 1970 NFL Draft:

Nine juniors from the 1969 Longhorns were selected in the 1971 NFL Draft:

Two sophomores from the 1969 Longhorns were selected in the 1972 NFL Draft:

Awards and honors
 Bob McKay, tackle, Consensus All-American

References

Texas
Texas Longhorns football seasons
College football national champions
Southwest Conference football champion seasons
Cotton Bowl Classic champion seasons
College football undefeated seasons
Texas Longhorns football